is a North Korean international school in Kanagawa-ku, Yokohama, Kanagawa, Japan.

See also
 List of junior high schools in Kanagawa Prefecture

References

External links
 Kanagawa Korean Jr./ Sr. High School  

International schools in Yokohama
High schools in Yokohama
North Korean schools in Japan